The Nylons are an a cappella group founded in 1978 in Toronto, Ontario, Canada, best known for their covers of pop songs such as The Turtles' "Happy Together", Steam's "Na Na Hey Hey Kiss Him Goodbye", and The Tokens' "The Lion Sleeps Tonight".

The band's current lineup includes Claude Morrison (tenor), Garth Mosbaugh (tenor/baritone), Gavin Hope (baritone/tenor/bass) and Tyrone Gabriel (bass/baritone). Morrison is the only original member still with the band (and still living) today.

The band has reissued all their albums on CD through Unidisc Music.

Career
The Nylons' original lineup consisted of Claude Morrison (tenor), Paul Cooper (baritone; born James Paul Cooper in Pikeville, Tennessee, February 20, 1950 – December 29, 2013), Marc Connors (tenor), and Denis Simpson (bass). In April 1979, Simpson left the group to perform in a musical and was replaced by Ralph Cole (bass). All of the original members were gay men, although later lineups included both gay and non-gay singers. Cole left the band in late 1981 and was replaced by Arnold Robinson (bass).

In 1986, the group appeared on the critically acclaimed children's television show Sharon, Lois & Bram's Elephant Show, featuring children's entertainers Sharon, Lois & Bram. The Nylons appeared in Season 3 of the show on the "Treasure Island" episode, singing "The Lion Sleeps Tonight".  These songs appeared on the band's albums Seamless (1984) and Rockapella (1989). During this era, the band also gained exposure from the mid-1980s syndicated sitcom Throb by singing (with the show's lead actress Diana Canova) the theme to the show.

In October 24, 1992, The Nylons sang "O Canada" at Atlanta-Fulton County Stadium in Atlanta, Georgia, preceding Game 6 of the 1992 World Series, in which their hometown team, the Toronto Blue Jays, won their first championship.

Cooper retired from the band in 1990 and was replaced by Micah Barnes (baritone). Connors died in 1991 from AIDS related complications, and was replaced by Billy Newton-Davis (tenor). In 1994 both Newton-Davis and Barnes left the group to pursue their solo careers, and were replaced by Garth Mosbaugh (tenor) and Gavin Hope (baritone) respectively. In 1997 Hope left the group to pursue a solo career and was replaced by Mark Cassius (baritone). In 2005, Cassius left the group; Tyrone Gabriel replaced him. After Robinson's retirement in early 2006, Gavin Hope returned as baritone; Tyrone Gabriel moved to the bass position to replace Robinson.

Paul Cooper died in 2013 of cardiac arrest, at the age of 63.

On May 30, 2014, the Nylons performed a show in Toronto which included the participation of every living past or present member of the band.

In fall and winter 2016, The Nylons toured and performed their farewell show throughout Canada.

Members

 Marc Connors (tenor 1978-1991) (died March 1991)*
 Paul Cooper (baritone 1978-1990) (died December 29, 2013)*
 Claude Morrison (tenor 1978–present)*
 Denis Simpson (bass 1978-1979) (died October 22, 2010)*
 Ralph Cole (bass 1979-1981) (deceased, buried in Manitoba, Canada)
 Arnold Robinson (bass 1981-2006) (died March 16, 2013)
 Micah Barnes (baritone 1990-1994)
 Billy Newton-Davis (tenor 1991-1994)
 Garth Mosbaugh (tenor 1994–present)
 Gavin Hope (baritone 1994-1997, 2006–present)
 Mark Cassius (baritone 1997-2005)
 Tyrone Gabriel (baritone 2005, bass 2006–2022) (died January 11, 2022)

* Denotes the four founding members.

Discography
Albums from 1982-1989 were released on Attic Records in Canada and Windham Hill in the United States, albums from 1989-1996 were released on BMG's Scotti Brothers imprint, and albums after 1997 were released on Shoreline Records.

 The Nylons (1982) #8 Canada
 One Size Fits All (1982) - #59 AUS / #25 Canada
 Seamless (1984) - #133 Billboard 200 / #40 Canada
 Happy Together (1987) - #43 Billboard 200 / #45 Canada
 Rockapella (1989) #60 Canada
 4 on the Floor (1991, live)
 Live to Love (1992)
 The Best of the Nylons (1993)
 Illustrious (1993)
 Another Fine Mesh (1994)
 Harmony: The Christmas Songs (1994)
 Because... (1994)
 Run for Cover (1996)
 Fabric of Life (1997)
 Hits of the 60's: A Cappella Style (1997)
 Perfect Fit (1997)
 A Wish for You (1999)
 Lost and Found (1999)
 Fabric of Life: Vocal Percussion Remix (2000)
 Play On (2002)
 Sterling (2006)
 Skintight (2011)

Singles

References

External Links
 
 
 Article at canadianbands.com
 Article at thecanadianencyclopedia.ca

Canadian pop music groups
LGBT-themed musical groups
Musical groups established in 1978
Professional a cappella groups
Windham Hill Records artists
Musical groups from Toronto
Attic Records (Canada) artists
1978 establishments in Ontario
Canadian LGBT musicians